Sir John Neil Falvey, K.B.E., Q.C. was a New Zealand-born lawyer, who served as Attorney General of Fiji from 1970 to 1977. Previously, he had served as legal adviser to the Fijian Affairs Board.

Early political career 

Falvey served as a member of the Legislative Council of Fiji in the 1960s.

In January 1963, Falvey signed what became known as the Wakaya letter, a document drawn up by the Great Council of Chiefs, which asserted the principle of ethnic Fijian paramountcy. This became the basic negotiating document of the Alliance Party (supported predominantly by ethnic Fijians and by Europeans) in the 1960s.

Following the 1963 elections, the first-ever held by universal suffrage, Governor Sir Derek Jakeway introduced the member system as a first step towards responsible government, which followed four years later. Three members of the Legislative Council (Ratu Sir Kamisese Mara, Dr A. D. Patel, and Falvey himself) were made members of the Executive Council of Fiji and appointed to oversee government departments. They were not "ministers" in the modern cabinet sense: they were a minority within the Executive Council, and although responsible to the Legislature, they were merely advisers to the Governor, who retained complete executive power. Falvey was appointed Member for Communication and Works, with responsibility covering meteorology, postal services, civil aviation, tourism, transport and hotels He served until 1966.

With the introduction of responsible government on 20 September 1967, Falvey was made a Minister without portfolio, meaning that he had no fixed responsibilities, but had a vote in the Cabinet and was assigned ad hoc tasks from time to time by Ratu Mara, who was now the Chief Minister of Fiji. He held this office until 1970

Attorney General 

In 1970, when Fiji became an independent Dominion, Falvey was appointed Attorney-General by the Prime Minister, Ratu Mara. In the 1972 elections, the first since independence in 1970, the number of General electors's representatives (representing ethnic minorities) in the House of Representatives was reduced from the ten they had been allocated in the former Legislative Council to eight; of these, only three were elected on a closed communal roll. Falvey did not contest this election, but was appointed to the Senate of Fiji as one of six nominees of the Prime Minister. After retiring as Attorney General, Falvey remained in the Senate until 1979, and chaired several Senate committees.

1987 constitutional review commission 

Following the first of two military coups, Governor-General Ratu Sir Penaia Ganilau appointed Falvey to chair a constitutional review commission. The commission was to begin hearings on 6 July, and deliver its recommendations to the Governor General by 31 July. Its terms of reference were to "strengthen the representation of indigenous Fijians, and in so doing bear in mind the best interests of other peoples in Fiji." The Commission received 860 written and 120 oral submissions, and produced a report recommending a new unicameral legislature comprising 36 Fijians (28 elected and 8 appointed by the Great Council of Chiefs), 22 Indo-Fijians, 8 General electors, 1 Rotuman, and up to four nominees of the Prime Minister. National constituencies, ethnically allocated by elected by universal suffrage, were to be abolished, and all voting was to be communal. The Prime Minister's post was to be reserved for an indigenous Fijian.

After a second military coup on 25 September that year, and the appointment of Ganilau as first President of a newly proclaimed republic, the government submitted the recommendations of the Falvey Commission to a review committee chaired by Paul Manueli, a former Commander of the Fijian military. Some adjustments were made, and the outcome was the 1990 Constitution, which entrenched indigenous Fijian dominance.

Personal life 

Falvey was a Roman Catholic. He had six children.

His interests included golf, and in 1978 he was President of the Fiji Golf Association.

References

1918 deaths
1990 deaths
Attorneys-general of Fiji
New Zealand emigrants to Fiji
Ethnic minority members of the Legislative Council of Fiji
Ethnic minority members of the Senate (Fiji)
Fijian Queen's Counsel
New Zealand King's Counsel
Fijian Roman Catholics
New Zealand Roman Catholics
Knights Commander of the Order of the British Empire
Fijian knights
New Zealand knights